Max Kruse (19 November 1921 – 4 September 2015) was a German writer, mostly known for his children's books Der Löwe ist los (The Lion is on the loose) and Urmel aus dem Eis (Urmel from the Ice Age).

Life 
Max Kruse was born in 1921, the youngest of seven children of the sculptor Max Kruse and his wife Käthe Kruse, a well-known dollmaker. He briefly studied Philosophy and Business economics at the University of Jena until it was shut down due to the Second World War. After the war he worked as a freelance ad writer and later as an author.

Besides writing he was part of the advisory council of the Giordano Bruno Foundation.

He lived in Penzberg with his third wife.

Probably his most famous work is Urmel aus dem Eis. It is widely recognized and referenced in Germany, especially the TV-adaption by the Augsburger Puppenkiste and the Hessischer Rundfunk. Based on this novel there is computer-animated feature film Impy's Island.

Works

Selected bibliography 
Max Kruse wrote over 50 books which include the following works:
 Der Löwe ist los (1952)
 Kakadu in Nöten (1958)
 Sultan in der Klemme (1959)
 Ruhige Insel gesucht (1965)
 Windkinder (1968)
 Der kleine Mensch bei den 5 Mächtigen (1968)
 Urmel aus dem Eis (1969)
 Der Schattenbruder (1985)
 Die versunkene Zeit. Bilder einer Kindheit im Käthe-Kruse-Haus (Autobiography) (1991)
 Der Auserwählte (1995)
 Lord Schmetterhemd (2000)
 Die behütete Zeit. Eine Jugend im Käthe-Kruse-Haus. (Autobiography) (2000)
 Kerlchens wundersame Reise (2001)
 Die Froki Saga (2010)
 Im Wandel der Zeit – wie ich wurde, was ich bin. (Autobiography) (2011)

Awards and nominations 
 1985 Der Schattenbruder was nominated for the Deutscher Jugendliteraturpreis (German Youth Literature Prize)
 1993 Order of Merit of the Federal Republic of Germany
 2000 Großer Preis der Deutschen Akademie für Kinder- und Jugendliteratur e.V. Volkach (Great Prize of the German Academy for Children's and Youth Literature)
 2013 Bavarian Order of Merit

References

External links 
 
 Kruse-Lesen
 Kruse-Urmel

1921 births
2015 deaths
German children's writers
German-language writers
People from Saxony-Anhalt
Bad Kösen
German male writers
Recipients of the Cross of the Order of Merit of the Federal Republic of Germany